The Karapoti Classic is New Zealand's longest-running annual mountain bike event, started in 1986 by Paul Kennett. From there it begins a single  loop in the native and pine forest of the Akatarawa Ranges.

The 1986 Karapoti was New Zealand's first national mountain bike race and was self declared the National Off-Road Championships. The event was managed by the Kennett Bros until 2002.

The event differs from most races because it comprises a large single loop and the route does not change from year to year.

With two exceptions, it has since 1993 been held on the first Saturday of March every year.

Race records

Individual results
Male and female winners since the inaugural race are shown in the table below.

References

External links
Official website
User provided write up at Tracks.org.nz

Mountain biking in New Zealand
Mountain biking events
1986 establishments in New Zealand
Recurring sporting events established in 1986
Upper Hutt